Belinda Bencic was the defending champion, but chose not to participate.

Peng Shuai won the title, defeating Viktória Kužmová in the final, 6–3, 6–0.

Seeds

Draw

Finals

Top half

Bottom half

References
Main Draw

Al Habtoor Tennis Challenge - Singles
Al Habtoor Tennis Challenge
2018 in Emirati tennis